Citronia is a genus of sea sponges in the family Dysideidae. It consists of one species, Citronia vasiformis (Bergquist, 1995).

References

Dictyoceratida
Monotypic sponge genera
Taxa named by Patricia Bergquist